Neostatherotis vietnamica is a moth of the family Tortricidae. It is found in Vietnam.

The wingspan is 22 mm. The ground colour of the forewings is whitish in the costal half of the wing and before the apex. The remaining area is strongly suffused yellowish brown and strigulated (finely streaked) brown also on the whitish areas. There is blackish suffusion and strigulation along the first median veins. The hindwings are pale brown.

Etymology
The name refers to native country of the holotype.

References

Moths described in 2008
Olethreutini
Moths of Asia
Taxa named by Józef Razowski